Canford School is a public school (English fee-charging boarding and day school for pupils aged 13–18). Situated in 300 acres of parkland near to the market town of Wimborne Minster in Dorset, south west England, it is one of the largest schools by area.

The school is a member of the Headmasters' and Headmistresses' Conference. Called a public school, Canford's fees in 2018 were £12,686 per term for boarders. The school is rated outstanding by Ofsted and is consistently ranked among the best co-educational independent schools nationally. In 2014, and again in 2016, Canford was among four runners-up for "Public School of the Year" in the Tatler School Awards and received the top award in 2019.

The school has an enrolment of 660 students, the highest in its history, aged between 13 and 18 spread across seven boarding and three day houses. Canford School counts among its alumni high-ranking military officers, pioneers in industry, computing, and economics, as well as senior figures in the Arts and Sciences.

History 

Canford Manor was particularly associated with John of Gaunt, 1st Duke of Lancaster - the third of five surviving sons of Edward III of England. The Duke exercised great influence over the English throne during the minority of Richard II's reign, and the ensuing periods of political strife. Records suggest the Canford Manor was used as a principal residence of John of Gaunt for some time. Of that early period, only the Norman church and 14th century refectory known as John O' Gaunt's Kitchen remains.  The main building, constituting the nucleus of the school, was designed by Edward Blore and later by Sir Charles Barry in the early and mid 1800s. The school itself was founded in 1923, having been "provided with a nucleus of boys and staff from a small private school in Weston-super-Mare".

Assyrian frieze

In 1992, a lost Assyrian stone relief was rediscovered on the wall of "the Grubber". Although it is at first sight rather unlikely that such a valuable item should be found on the wall of a school tuck shop, the history of the school explains how the relief came to be there. It had been brought back from the site of Nimrud in northern Mesopotamia (Iraq) by Sir Austen Henry Layard along with other antiquities which were displayed at Canford before it was a school. Originally Canford had been a private country house (known as Canford Manor), designed by Edward Blore and improved by Sir Charles Barry, and the residence of Layard's cousin and mother-in-law, Lady Charlotte Guest and her husband, Sir John Josiah Guest. At that time, the building now known as the Grubber had been used to display antiquities and was known as "the Nineveh Porch". It was however believed by the school authorities to be a plaster copy of an original which had been lost overboard during river transit and little attention was paid to it after the school was established. A dartboard was even hung in the Grubber close to where the frieze was displayed. It was John Russell of Columbia University who identified the frieze as an original, one of a set of three relief slabs taken from the throne room of Assyrian King Assurnasirpal II (883–859 BC). A new plaster copy now stands in the foyer of the Layard Theatre at Canford and a number of "Assyrian Scholarships" are available, funded from the sale proceeds which also helped pay for the construction of a new sports facility.

The original relief is now part of the collection of the Miho Museum in Japan.

The Layard Theatre
The Layard Theatre is situated inside Canford School and is open to the public.

The Bourne Academy
Since September 2010 Canford School is the sponsor of The Bourne Academy, a state-funded school in Bournemouth.

Sport

Real Tennis
The school is one of four in the United Kingdom with a real tennis court (the others being The Oratory, Radley and Wellington College).  It is unique among these schools in that its court dates back to 1879 when it was a country house, whereas the others have all been newly built for the schools since 1990.

Rowing
The school has an active rowing club called the Canford School Boat Club which is based on the River Stour. The club is affiliated to British Rowing (boat code CAN) and has produced three British champion crews at the 2002 British Rowing Championships, 2008 British Rowing Championships and 2010 British Rowing Championships.

Old Canfordians

Former pupils of Canford School are known as Old Canfordians.
Notable alumni include:

The Very Reverend Henry Lloyd (1911–2001), Anglican priest, Dean of Truro
Stephen Ward (1912–1963), osteopath involved in the Profumo affair<ref name=
Hector Maclean (1913–2007), decorated RAF officer during Battle of Britain<ref name=
Sir George Clark, 3rd Baronet DL (1914–1991), Unionist politician in Northern Ireland<ref name=
Sir Ralph Verney, 5th Baronet KBE, DL (1915-2001) British Army Officer and Politician<ref name=
Sir Ashley Bramall (1916–1999), leader of the Inner London Education Authority, 1970–1981<ref name=
Charles Maclean of Duart, Baron Maclean (1916–1990), Chief Scout of the United Kingdom, 1959–1971, Chief Scout of the Commonwealth, 1959–1975, and Lord Chamberlain, 1971–1984<ref name=
Lieutenant Colonel Hilary Hook (1917–1990), Soldier and 'Home from the Hill' star<ref name=
Ted Cooke-Yarborough (1918–2013) physicist and WW2 radar and computer pioneer<ref name=
Paul Feiler (1918-2013), abstract artist<ref name=
Mike Randall (1919–1999), editor of the Daily Mail and Sunday Times<ref name=
David Sheldrick (1919–1977), Anglo-Kenyan conservationist<ref name=
John Barnes (1920-2008), Historian<ref name=
Peter Hare (1920–2001), cricketer<ref name=
Rear Admiral John Templeton-Cotill (1920-2011), Naval Officer<ref name=
Hector Monro, Baron Monro of Langholm (1922–2006), Conservative politician<ref name=
Michael Medwin (1923-2020), actor<ref name=
Alexander Paton (1924-2015), Physician and Author of ABC of Alcohol<ref name=
Stuart Symington (1926–2009), cricketer<ref name=
John Douglas, 21st Earl of Morton (1927–2016), Deputy Lieutenant of West Lothian<ref name=
Michael Ash (1927), Mathematician, brewer, and inventor of the Easy Serve Draught Guinness<ref name=
Iain Campbell (1928-2015), Cricketer<ref name=
Rutherford Aris (1929–2005), chemical engineer, Regents Professor Emeritus<ref name=
David Littman (born 1933), historian and human rights advocate<ref name=
Sir John Drummond (1934–2006), arts administrator, former controller of BBC Radio 3<ref name=
General Sir Brian Kenny (1934-2017)<ref name=
Second Lieutenant Paul Benner GC (1935–1957), awarded the George Cross<ref name=
Stan Brock (1936), television presenter, philanthropist<ref name=
Anthony Bryer OBE (1937-2016), Historian<ref name=
Air Chief Marshal Sir Roger Palin (born 1938)<ref name=
Simon Preston CBE (born 1938), organist, conductor, composer<ref name=
Stephen Rubin OBE (born 1938), founder of Pentland Industries (Hunter, Speedo, Berghaus, Ellesse, etc.)<ref name=
Derek Jarman (1942–1994), film director and gay rights activist<ref name=
Ian Bradshaw (born 1940s), Photographer and winner of the World Press Photo Award<ref name=
Sir Henry Cecil (1943–2013), champion race horse trainer<ref name=
Admiral Sir Ian Garnett (born 1944), naval officer<ref name=
Rear Admiral Sir Jeremy De Halpert KCVO, CB (born 1945), Naval Secretary<ref name=
Tim Stevenson (born 1948), Lord Lieutenant<ref name=
Simon Crowcroft (born 1950), Connétable of St Helier<ref name=
David Docwra (born 1953), cricketer and educator<ref name=
Alan Hollinghurst (born 1954), Booker Prize winning author<ref name=
Peter Parker (born 1954), Author, Journalist, and Fellow of the Royal Society of Literature<ref name=
Christopher Edward Berkeley Portman, 10th Viscount Portman (born 1958), British peer and property developer<ref name=
Owen Bennett-Jones, journalist, 'Newshour'<ref name=
Sir Philip Moor (born 1959), judge of the High Court of England and Wales<ref name=
Nigel Robertson (born 1962), entrepreneur, founder of FreePages plc<ref name=
Simon Hilton (born 1967), music video director<ref name=
Nick Robertson OBE (born 1967), Co-founder and former CEO of ASOS<ref name=
Tom Holland, (born 1968), novelist and popular historian<ref name=
Major General Nicholas Borton DSO MBE (born 1969), General Officer Commanding 3rd Division<ref name=
Stephen Phillips QC, MP (born 1970), Conservative politician<ref name=
Giles Duley (born 1971), photojournalist<ref name=
James Le Mesurier (1971-2019), Founder of White Helmets<ref name=
Miranda Cooper (born 1975), formerly the singer 'Moonbaby', songwriter and director of the company Xenomania<ref name=
William Villiers, 10th Earl of Jersey (born 1976)<ref name=
Yvonne Lui (born 1977), property magnate, philanthropist<ref name=
Nicholas Ashley-Cooper, 12th Earl of Shaftesbury (born 1979)<ref name=
Ben Gollings (born 1980), England rugby sevens player<ref name=
Alex Hibbert (born 1986), polar explorer<ref name=
Ore Oduba (born 1986), Presenter and sports journalist, 2016 Winner of Strictly Come Dancing<ref name=
Brice Stratford (born 1987) Shakespearean Actor-manager<ref name=
Chloe-Jasmine Whichello (born 1991) Reality TV star<ref name=
Brianna Stubbs (born 1991), GB rower<ref name=

See also
Bryanston School, Dorset
Sherborne School, Dorset

References

Sources

External links
Canford School website
Profile at the Good Schools Guide
The Allied Schools

Boarding schools in Dorset
1923 establishments in England
Real tennis venues
Schools in Poole
Private schools in Bournemouth, Christchurch and Poole
People educated at Canford School
Member schools of the Headmasters' and Headmistresses' Conference
Wimborne Minster
Educational institutions established in 1923
Grade I listed buildings in Dorset
Edward Blore buildings
Schools cricket
Racquets venues
Grade I listed educational buildings
Exempt charities
Schools with a royal charter
Church of England private schools in the Diocese of Oxford